The Barbur Boulevard Transit Center is a TriMet transit center located at 9750 SW Barbur Boulevard, near the intersection with Capitol Highway in southwest Portland, Oregon. Barbur TC is proposed to be a future stop on the MAX Green Line as part of the SW Corridor MAX Project, which would extend the Green Line from its current terminus at the PSU South stations southward to Bridgeport Village in Tualatin.

Bus line connections
The following bus routes currently serve the transit center:
 12 – Barbur/Sandy Boulevard
 64 – Marquam Hill/Tigard
 94 – Pacific Hwy/Sherwood 

Previously, the SMART bus 2X route served the transit center, but service was reduced to only go as far north as the Tualatin Park & Ride in September 2019.

See also
 List of TriMet transit centers

References

External links

 Barbur Blvd. Transit Center – TriMet page

TriMet transit centers
1977 establishments in Oregon
Bus stations in Portland, Oregon